Danielle Lauren Steers (born 20 June 1991) is an English stage actress and singer-songwriter. She is known for originating the role of Zahara in Bat Out of Hell: The Musical at the Manchester Opera House, as well as subsequently playing the role in various productions (including in the West End and Off-Broadway productions) until 2019. She is also known for portraying Catherine Parr in Six at the Arts Theatre, Lyric Theatre and Vaudeville Theatre and portraying Lady in the 2022-23 UK Tour of The Cher Show. Her debut album The Future Ain't What It Used To Be was released in 2021.

Early life 
Steers was born and raised in Barnsley, Yorkshire and attended Darton High School until she graduated in 2007. Steers then started training at SLP College in 2007 for three years until she graduated on 3 July 2010. Steers has openly spoken about her broad range of allergic reactions that have affected her since her early life, which include allergic rhinitis and allergies to dust mites, white wine and cats. She is also lactose intolerant.

Career 
Whilst training at SLP College, Steers performed in the play Snoopy at the SLP College Studio Theatre, as well as That's Entertainment at the Bradford Alhambra Theatre, Caberet at The Met Hotel in Leeds and Hey Mr. Composer at the Grand Opera House York. As a singer-songwriter, she released a single titled "Taking Back My Life" in 2019 as part of her album "The Future Ain't What It Used To Be", which was originally scheduled to be released alongside her solo concert on 2 March 2020 at the Arts Theatre, although the concert has since been postponed until further notice due to the COVID-19 pandemic. Steers was also a backing singer for Sheila Ferguson on BBC Radio 2's Wake Up to Wogan. She is currently a client of Shepherd Management.

Steers appeared in the originally staged West End production of Six at the Arts Theatre (before it transferred to the new production at the Lyric Theatre) alongside principal cast colleagues Jarnéia Richard-Noel, Courtney Bowman, Natalie Paris, Alexia McIntosh and Sophie Isaacs. Steers was also due to feature in a Live Drive-In UK Tour of Six presented by Utilita Energy, in association with Live Nation. The performances were due to take place in compliance with the HM Government's COVID-19 social distancing measures at various venues across the UK. However, promoters Live Nation announced the cancellation of the tour due to fears over potential localised lockdowns in response to the ongoing coronavirus pandemic.

Steers also launched 'Six Scents', an artisan candle company in collaboration with business partner Maddison Firth in July 2020 that produces a wide range of scents inspired by the musical Six. Steers performed in several socially distanced concerts in 2020, including two drive-in collaborative concerts at 'The Drive In' located within the London Borough of Enfield, a tribute concert to the Spice Girls at both the Turbine Theatre within Battersea Power Station and 'The Drive In' located within the London Borough of Enfield. Steers is currently performing in Six at the Lyric Theatre, it was one of the first musical to return to the West End after the COVID-19 pandemic. From late September 2021, Steers is then due to move to the nearby Vaudeville Theatre until her final performance as Catherine Parr on 14 November 2021.

In January 2021, Steers released her debut album titled "The Future Ain't What It Used To Be", recorded in the summer of 2019. The album comprises 9 songs, all composed by songwriter Jim Steinman, she cites her production of the album to fans of Bat Out of Hell: The Musical for being "incredibly supportive", the album was arranged by Noam Galperin.

Theatre credits

Personal life
Steers currently resides in London. She cites Shirley Bassey as one of her greatest inspirations when she was younger, and the main persona that sparked her future endeavour to become an actress and singer-songwriter. In July 2021, Steers underwent surgery to correct a deviated septum, a condition in which the nasal septum is significantly off-centre, making breathing difficult and uncomfortable, this consequently meant she had to miss performances of Six from 29 June to 1 August 2021. During her absence the role of Catherine Parr was portrayed by Athena Collins. Steers is currently engaged to fellow West End actor Stephen Webb.

Discography

References

1991 births
Living people
Actresses from Yorkshire
English stage actresses
English musical theatre actresses
21st-century English actresses
21st-century English women singers
21st-century English singers